The sport of football in the country of Brunei is run by the Football Association of Brunei Darussalam (FABD).

History

FIFA Goal Project 
In 2005, the Association had their first goal project approved; the construction of the association headquarters in Bandar Seri Begawan. The total cost was approximately 1.5 million USD. A second goal project was approved in 2013, which was the installation of an artificial turf pitch and a natural pitch at the headquarters. The total cost was about 185,000 USD.

FIFA Forward Project 
In 2020, the football association applied to FIFA for the construction of a Technical Centre and Mini Grandstand which was approved in April 2021. The construction started in June and is expected to finish at the end of the year.

League system 
Football clubs must adhere to AFC's Club Development Licensing System in order to participate in the top two leagues (Brunei Super League, Brunei Premier League) as well as cup competitions.

National teams 

The Brunei national football team represents Brunei in international football. Other youth teams representing Brunei in other competitions include Brunei national under-23 football team, also known as the Brunei Olympic team, the Brunei national under-21 football team, the Brunei national under-19 football team, and the Brunei national under-17 football team. The Brunei national futsal team represents men's international futsal.

Stadiums 

Some of the major stadiums used for various Brunei league teams as follow:

Other venues:

 Track & Field Sports Complex
 Berakas Sports Complex
 Tutong Sports Complex
 Batu Api Sports Complex
 FABD Artificial Field
 Hassanal Bolkiah Mini Stadium
 Jerudong Park Mini Stadium
 Bolkiah Garrison Mini Stadium
 Arena Field
 BSRC Field

References